Selce is a small village northeast of Kamno in the Municipality of Tolmin in the Littoral region of Slovenia.

References

External links
Selce on Geopedia

Populated places in the Municipality of Tolmin